John Doherty (born 12 April 1908; date of death unknown), also known as Jack "Dot" Doherty, was an Irish footballer who played as an inside-left and made three appearances for the IFA national team.

Club career
Doherty played for Park End in the North of Ireland Combination, as well as for Belfast Celtic. He joined Woodburn in the Intermediate League for the 1925–26 and 1926–27 seasons, before moving to Portadown in 1927. In 1930 he joined Ards, and later played for Cliftonville in the 1932–33 season. In December 1932 he signed for Charlton Athletic in the Football League, where he played until the end of the 1933–34 season.

International career
Doherty earned seven caps for the Ireland Amateurs from 1927 to 1931. On 21 February 1928 he appeared for Ireland national team in a 4–0 loss against France, though whether the match was a "full international" is disputed. He earned two additional caps for Ireland in 1932 as part of the 1932–33 British Home Championship, appearing in a 1–0 loss against England on 17 October in Blackpool and a 4–1 loss against Wales on 7 December in Wrexham.

Career statistics

International

References

External links
 
 
 
 

1908 births
Year of death missing
Association footballers from Belfast
Association footballers from Northern Ireland
Northern Ireland amateur international footballers
Pre-1950 IFA international footballers
Association football inside forwards
Belfast Celtic F.C. players
Portadown F.C. players
Ards F.C. players
Cliftonville F.C. players
Charlton Athletic F.C. players
NIFL Premiership players
English Football League players